The 2004 Pacific Curling Championships were held at the Euiam Ice Rink in Chuncheon, South Korea from November 20 to 25. 

New Zealand's Sean Becker won the men's event over Australia's Hugh Millikin. By virtue of reaching the finals, both nations qualified for the 2005 Ford World Men's Curling Championship in Victoria, British Columbia.

On the women's side, Japan's Yumie Funayama defeated China's Wang Bingyu in the final. This qualified both Japan and China for the 2005 World Women's Curling Championship in Paisley, Scotland.

Men's

Final Round Robin Standings

Playoffs

Women's

Final Round Robin Standings

Playoffs

External links

Pacific Curling Championships, 2005
Pacific-Asia Curling Championships
International curling competitions hosted by South Korea
2004 in South Korean sport
Chuncheon